The Prudential Center is a sports and entertainment arena in Newark, New Jersey, United States

Prudential Center may also refer to:

 Prudential Center (shopping mall), in Boston, Massachusetts, United States

Other similarly named buildings include:
 Prudential Tower, Boston, Massachusetts, United States
 One Prudential Plaza, Chicago, Illinois, United States
 Two Prudential Plaza, Chicago, Illinois, United States
 Prudential Headquarters, the headquarters of Prudential Financial in Newark, New Jersey, United States
 Prudential Plaza, the former name of the Eight Forty One building in Jacksonville, Florida
 Two Prudential Plaza (Jacksonville), Jacksonville, Florida, United States

For other uses see 
 Prudential (disambiguation)